Saïoua is a town in west-central Ivory Coast. It is a sub-prefecture and commune of Issia Department in Haut-Sassandra Region, Sassandra-Marahoué District.

In 2021, the population of the sub-prefecture of Saïoua was 100,085.

Villages
The 27 villages of the sub-prefecture of Saïoua and their population in 2014 are:

Notes

Sub-prefectures of Haut-Sassandra
Communes of Haut-Sassandra